The Hollomon–Jaffe parameter (HP), also generally known as the Larson–Miller  parameter, describes the effect of a heat treatment at a temperature for a certain time.
This parameter is especially used to describe the tempering of steels, so that it is also called tempering parameter.

Effect
The effect of the heat treatment depends on its temperature and its time. The same effect can be achieved with a low temperature and a long holding time, or with a higher temperature and a short holding time.

Formula
In the Hollomon–Jaffe parameter, this exchangeability of time and temperature can be described by the following formula:

This formula is not consistent concerning the units; the parameters must be entered in a certain manner. T is in degrees Celsius. The argument of the logarithmic function has the unit hours. C is a parameter unique to the material used. The Hollomon parameter itself is unitless and realistic numeric values vary between 15 and 21.

where T is in kilokelvins, t is in hours, and C is the same as above.

Holloman  and  Jaffe  determined  the  value  of  C  experimentally  by  plotting  hardness  versus  tempering  time  for  a  series  of  tempering  temperatures  of  interest  and  interpolating the data to obtain the time necessary to yield a number of different hardness values.  This  work  was  based  on  six  different  heats  of  plain  carbon  steels  with  carbon  contents varying from 0.35%–1.15%. The value of C was found to vary somewhat for different steels and decrease linearly with the carbon content of a steel grade. Holloman and Jaffe proposed that C = 19.5 for carbon and alloy steels with carbon contents of 0.25%–0.4%; and C = 15 for tool steels with carbon contents of 0.9%–1.2%.

See also
 Zener–Hollomon parameter

References

Metal heat treatments